Aviram Baruchyan (born March 20, 1985) is an Israeli professional football player who currently plays for Agudat Sport Nordia Jerusalem.

Career
He has been playing for Beitar Jerusalem since Youth level. In the 2002–2003 season he moved to the Senior team. Baruchyan plays as a creative midfielder.

He wears the number 8 jersey which is the same number that his famous uncle wore. His uncle is former Beitar legend Uri Malmilian. When Avi Nimni played in Beitar, Baruchyan handed him the number 8 since it is also Nimni's preferred number. Baruchyan wore temporarily the number 16.

He made his debut for the Israel national football team against Croatia on 13 October 2007.

On 3 January 2012, Baruchyan signed with Polish team Polonia Warsaw a two-and-half year contract.

On 20 September 2012, Baruchyan signed with Israel team Hapoel Be'er Sheva.

On 9 October 2013, Baruchyan came back home and signed with Beitar Jerusalem.

On 23 October 2014, Baruchyan signed to Hapoel Katamon Jerusalem.
On May 25, 2018, Baruchyan left Hapoel Katamon.

On 17 June 2018 Baruchyan signed to Hapoel Rishon LeZion.

Personal life
On 27 October 2009, Baruchyan married his girlfriend Rikki in a traditional Jewish ceremony in Jerusalem.
Evyatar Baruchyan is his brother.

Honours
Israeli Premier League (2):
2006–07, 2007–08
Israel State Cup (2):
2008, 2009
Toto Cup Al (1):
2009–10
Liga Alef (1):
2014-15

Notes

References
 On Nov. 13, 2008 IMScouting has selected Aviram Bruchyan as "Player to Watch"

External links

1985 births
Living people
Israeli Jews
Israeli footballers
Beitar Jerusalem F.C. players
Polonia Warsaw players
Hapoel Be'er Sheva F.C. players
Hapoel Katamon Jerusalem F.C. players
Hapoel Rishon LeZion F.C. players
Hapoel Ashdod F.C. players
Israeli Premier League players
Ekstraklasa players
Liga Leumit players
Israel international footballers
Israeli expatriate footballers
Expatriate footballers in Poland
Israeli expatriate sportspeople in Poland
Footballers from Jerusalem
Israeli people of Kurdish-Jewish descent
Israel under-21 international footballers
Association football midfielders